Kenswick may refer to:
 Kenswick, Worcestershire
 Kenswick, Texas